HSwMS Sköld was a small river monitor built for the Swedish Royal Skerry Artillery in the late 1860s. She was equipped with a dual propulsion system, both hand and steam-driven, although the hand-driven portion was removed early in the ship's career due to complaints from the crew. The ship was put into reserve in 1890 and used as a gunnery target in 1907.

Design and description
In 1865 the Navy Minister, Baltzar J. van Platen, persuaded the Riksdag of the Estates to establish the Royal Skerry Artillery as part of the Swedish Army to defend the inner Swedish waters and protect the flanks of Swedish fortresses. This force was to be equipped with ten small monitors to operate in shallow waters that could navigate the Göta Canal system that linked Gothenburg on the west coast to Söderköping on the Baltic Sea.

HSwMS Sköld was the second of these monitors. She was designed by the inventor John Ericsson
and Lieutenant John Christian d'Ailly. Her crew initially numbered 40 officers and men, but it was reduced to 29 when the rowing mechanism was removed early in the ship's career.

Skölds most unusual feature was that John Ericsson designed, and had built in New York City, a combined hand and steam propulsion system. The ship also had a single horizontal 2-cylinder steam engine that was powered by a single semi-circular fire-tube boiler.

The ship was briefly armed with a single  M/66 smoothbore gun, mounted in a long, fixed, oval-shaped turret, before being rearmed in 1870 with a  M/69 rifled breech loader. During the late 1870s Sköld received a 10-barreled  M/75 machine gun designed by Helge Palmcrantz.

The name, Sköld, is Swedish for 'Shield'.

Service
Sköld was built in 1868 by Bergsund at Stockholm. She was incorporated into the Swedish Navy  in 1873. The ship's crew did not appreciate the hand-driven propulsion system; they had not joined the navy to be "galley slaves" and the system was soon removed. Sköld was placed in reserve in 1890 and sunk as a target in 1907. Curiously, the ship never once navigated the Göta Canal system in her career.

Footnotes

References
 
 

 

1868 ships
Ships built in Stockholm